Adam Ralegh (c. 1480 – 1545 or later), of Fardel and Plympton St Mary, Devon; London, and Southwark, Surrey,  was an English politician.

He was a Member (MP) of the Parliament of England for Totnes in 1529.

References

1480 births
16th-century deaths
English MPs 1529–1536
Members of the Parliament of England (pre-1707) for Totnes
Politicians from London
People from Southwark
Members of the Parliament of England for Plympton Erle